Pengwern was a Brythonic settlement of sub-Roman Britain situated in what is now the English county of Shropshire, adjoining the modern Welsh border. It is generally regarded as being the early seat of the kings of Powys before its establishment at Mathrafal, further west, but the theory that it may have been an early kingdom (or a sub-kingdom of Powys itself) has also been postulated. Its precise location is uncertain.

History and legend
Nothing is known about the foundation of Pengwern, although according to Welsh tradition it was part of the Welsh kingdom of Powys in the early Middle Ages. Early Powys, much larger in extent than the later medieval kingdom, seems to have roughly coincided with the territory of the Celtic Cornovii tribe whose civitas capital or administrative centre was Viroconium Cornoviorum (now Wroxeter).

The exploits of Cynddylan, as imagined around the ninth century, are told in the Old Welsh Canu Heledd (a cycle of poems named after Cynddylan's sister), possibly dating from the ninth century but not recorded until later, and this material situates Cynddylan's seat at Pengwern. These relate to a further cycle of heroic and elegiac poetry concerning early Powys and the Hen Ogledd known as Canu Llywarch Hen.

Possible locations
A number of places still identifiable in the Shropshire landscape today are mentioned alongside Pengwern in this poetry. The exact location of Llys Pengwern - the Court of Pengwern - is not known, and the problem is compounded by the fact that several other Pengwerns exist in Wales (e.g. near Denbigh in north Wales). A tradition, recorded by Giraldus Cambrensis in the late 12th century, associates it with the site of modern Shrewsbury (although that town has been known as Amwythig in Welsh since the Middle Ages). A number of alternative locations have been proposed. A more recent suggestion is the Berth, a dramatic hillfort at Baschurch, but the archaeological evidence shows only the Iron Age fort with possible Roman reuse. Wroxeter, the former Roman town of Viroconium Cornoviorum lies in proximity to these places.  Archaeological evidence suggests that Wroxeter continued in use after the Roman withdrawal and was only finally abandoned in about 520 when it had become indefensible as the last vestiges of Romano-British central government broke down. Another theory is that the earthworks under Whittington Castle may be Pengwern.

Conflict with Northumbria
Cynddylan apparently joined forces with king Penda of Mercia to protect his realm, and together they fought against the increasingly powerful Anglian Kingdom of Northumbria at the Battle of Maes Cogwy (Oswestry) in 642. It was here that their mutual enemy, king Oswald was slain. This seems to have bought a period of peace until Penda's death when a Northumbrian raiding party led by Oswald's brother Oswiu of Northumbria overran Cynddylan's palace at Llys Pengwern in a surprise attack. Caught completely off guard and without defence the royal family, including the king, were slaughtered, according to the poetry commemorating the tragedy. Princess Heledd was the only survivor and fled to western Powys. After this the region associated with Pengwern seems to have been shared between Mercia and Powys; part of it remained in Welsh hands until the reign of Offa of Mercia and the construction of his dyke. Part of it consisted of the Anglian sub-kingdom of the Magonsæte.

Later usage
In Shrewsbury there is the Pengwern Boat Club on the banks of the River Severn, opposite The Quarry park, as well as other shops and businesses that use the name.

References

Clancy, Joseph (1970), The Earliest Welsh Poetry
Remfry, P. M. Whittington Castle and the families of Bleddyn ap Cynfyn, Peverel, Maminot, Powys and Fitz Warin
Williams, Ifor (1935) Canu Llywarch Hen

History of Shropshire
History of Wales
History of Powys
Sub-Roman Britain